The 2012–13 Premier League (known as the Barclays Premier League for sponsorship reasons) was the 21st season of the Premier League, the English professional league for association football clubs, since its establishment in 1992, and the 114th season of top-flight English football overall. The fixture schedule was released on 18 June 2012. The season began on 18 August 2012 and ended on 19 May 2013.

Manchester City were the defending champions, having won their first Premier League title the previous season. This was their first top division league title since the 1967–68 season.

On 22 April 2013, Manchester United won their 13th Premier League title and 20th English title overall by defeating Aston Villa 3–0 at Old Trafford. This left reigning champions Manchester City 16 points behind with only 15 left to play for. It was the first time the title had been decided in April since Chelsea were the winners in 2005–06. It was also only the fourth time in the history of the Premier League that it had been won with at least four games remaining in the season, the last time being in 2003–04 when Arsenal were champions. England national football team manager, Roy Hodgson declared that United's manager, Sir Alex Ferguson, was a "magician" having won 13 titles in 21 seasons.

On 28 April 2013, Queens Park Rangers and Reading were both relegated from the Premier League after a 0–0 draw against each other. Wigan Athletic were the third and final club to be relegated, after a 4–1 defeat to Arsenal on 14 May 2013. This brought an end to their eight-year stay in the Premier League, and came three days after winning the season's FA Cup.  This made them the first club to win the FA Cup and suffer relegation in the same season.

Season summary
The season opened the weekend of 18 August 2012. Defending champions Manchester City opened their season with a narrow 3–2 victory over Southampton, who had just been promoted back to the Premier League after seven seasons in lower divisions. Man City had taken a 1–0 lead, with Southampton turning it on its head to go 2–1 up with 20 minutes remaining. City eventually came back and Samir Nasri scored the winning goal with ten minutes left. In a Monday evening fixture at Goodison Park, Manchester United started their season with a 1–0 loss to Everton, the goal scored by Marouane Fellaini. The first goal of the season, however, was scored by Swansea City's Michu, whose team thrashed Queens Park Rangers 5–0 away from home.

Manchester United recovered from their opening week loss with a 3–2 win over Fulham in their opening home game at Old Trafford, but lost striker Wayne Rooney to injury during the match. Other second week highlights included Chelsea's 2–0 win over Newcastle United, with recent Belgian signing Eden Hazard involved in both goals.

Early leaders Chelsea had week three off, while a win by Manchester City over Queens Park Rangers left the defending champions two points off the pace. The game was a highly anticipated rematch between the two teams that squared off on the final day of the 2011–12 season, when Manchester City snatched the title on goal difference with a late goal by Sergio Agüero. This time though, it was less exciting, with Manchester City comfortably winning 3–1. Level on points with Manchester City in second place were Swansea City, who registered a 2–2 draw with Sunderland, and West Bromwich Albion, who defeated Everton 2–0.

The fourth week of the season began with controversy, as the Chelsea v Queens Park Rangers match was fraught with racial tensions when QPR's Anton Ferdinand refused to shake hands with Chelsea's John Terry, who had been suspended for four games for using racial epithets against Ferdinand during the previous season. The teams would play out a 0–0 draw, however second place Manchester City could not gain ground as they also drew, with Stoke City.

Week five saw Chelsea extend their league lead to 3 points with a 1–0 win over Stoke City. A late goal in the 85th minute by Ashley Cole secured the win for the Blues. Everton and West Bromwich Albion maintained control of second place, with both teams notching a win in week five, though a draw by the Baggies in week six would drop them back to fifth place, which they would share with Tottenham Hotspur following their surprise 3–2 win over Manchester United at Old Trafford. Chelsea, Everton, and Manchester City would all win in week six. The results table after six games would have Chelsea in the lead with 16 points, followed by Everton and Manchester City with 13 points each, and Manchester United with 12. At the bottom of the league, Liverpool forward Luis Suárez scored a hat trick against Norwich City, leading Liverpool to a 5–2 victory. It was the second consecutive year that Suárez had scored a hat trick at Carrow Road.

The month of October saw a tightening at the top of the standings, with Chelsea, Manchester United and Manchester City all winning their first two of three games for the month, setting up a vital Sunday afternoon match at Stamford Bridge between third placed Manchester United and the leaders Chelsea. The game did not disappoint, as Chelsea went down 2–0 early on an own goal by David Luiz in the fourth minute and a goal by Robin van Persie in the 12th. Van Persie had also taken the shot that had rebounded off of Luiz, and thus was ultimately responsible for the Red Devil's one-goal lead at half-time, following a late first half goal by Chelsea's Juan Mata from a free kick. Eight minutes into the second half Ramires equalised for Chelsea, and in the 75th minute United's Javier Hernández scored what proved to be the deciding goal via a rebound from a missed Van Persie shot. Replays showed that Hernández was in an offside position, generating a great deal of controversy. After the game, only a single point separated leaders Chelsea from second placed Manchester United. The rest of the standings were tightly packed in mid-table as 4 points separated fourth through ninth place. Another key match in October included a fixture between Liverpool and Reading, with Liverpool winning 1–0 (with winger Raheem Sterling scoring his first goal for the club) and giving manager Brendan Rodgers his first win at Anfield in the league against Reading, a team he formerly managed. The final week of October featured the longest match in the 20-year history of the Premier League, a 103-minute game between Manchester City and Swansea that featured two serious injuries, one to the groin of Swansea keeper Michel Vorm and the other to the knee of Manchester City back Micah Richards, both of which required stretchers to carry them off. City prevailed 1–0 in the marathon event with a goal from Carlos Tevez.

League leaders Chelsea suffered a dip in form in November. They opened the month with draws against Swansea City and Liverpool, dropping them to third in the standings. A loss to West Bromwich Albion on 17 November was marked by ineffective second half play, as the team was unable to capitalise on a late first half equaliser by Eden Hazard. The Blues closed out the month with uninspiring 0–0 draws against Manchester City and Fulham. The primary beneficiaries of Chelsea's slide were Manchester United and Manchester City, as the two rivals moved into commanding control of the first two places in the league table. Key November games included a 2–1 Manchester United win over Arsenal on 3 November, and a dominating 5–0 win by Manchester City over Aston Villa on 17 November marked by a pair of two-goal performances by Carlos Tevez and Sergio Aguero. West Bromwich Albion proved to be the biggest mover up the league table, moving from eighth up to joint third with Chelsea, on the strength of four wins over Southampton, Wigan Athletic, Chelsea, and Sunderland. At the bottom end of the table, Queens Park Rangers found themselves as the only team without a league win by the end of November.

The month of December saw minimal change in the standings at the top end of the table. The situation by New Year's Eve with the top three places was the same as it was at the start of the month, though Manchester United had extended their lead over second place Manchester City to seven points, with Chelsea four points back from City in third place. Tottenham Hotspur occupied fourth place with Arsenal, Everton, and West Bromwich Albion all tied for fifth. Chelsea stopped their November slide with a 3–1 win at Sunderland on 8 December on the strength of two goals by Fernando Torres. The Manchester derby was renewed on 9 December at the City of Manchester Stadium with first place on the line. United took a two-goal lead thanks to two goals from Wayne Rooney in the 16th and 30th minute. City responded with a Yaya Touré goal in the 60th minute, a goal that followed two saves in rapid succession by United keeper David de Gea. Pablo Zabaleta equalised in the 86th minute, but Robin van Persie once again proved to be the hero for United, scoring the winning goal two minutes into injury time to extend United's lead over City at the top of the table to six points. The last team without a league win, Queens Park Rangers, finally got their first win of the season on 15 December.

Teams
Twenty teams competed in the league – the top seventeen teams from the previous season and the three teams promoted from the Championship. The promoted teams were Reading, Southampton and West Ham United, returning to the top flight after absences of four, seven and one year respectively. They replaced Bolton Wanderers, Blackburn Rovers (both teams relegated after eleven years in the top flight) and Wolverhampton Wanderers (ending their three-year top flight spell).

Stadiums and locations

''Note: Table lists in alphabetical order.

Personnel and kits

Note: Flags indicate national team as has been defined under FIFA eligibility rules. Players may hold more than one non-FIFA nationality.

 Additionally, referee kits are now being sponsored by Expedia.com, and Nike has a new match ball, the Maxim Premier League.

Managerial changes

League table

Results

Season statistics

Scoring
 First goal of the season: Michu for Swansea City against Queens Park Rangers (18 August 2012)
 Fastest goal of the season: 20 seconds, Theo Walcott for Arsenal against Queens Park Rangers (4 May 2013)
 Last goal of the season: Urby Emanuelson for Fulham against Swansea City, (19 May 2013)
 Largest winning margin: 8 goals
Chelsea 8–0 Aston Villa (23 December 2012)
 Highest scoring game: 10 goals
Arsenal 7–3 Newcastle United (29 December 2012)
West Bromwich Albion 5–5 Manchester United (19 May 2013)
 Most goals scored in a match by a single team: 8 goals
Chelsea 8–0 Aston Villa (23 December 2012)
 Most goals scored in a match by a losing team: 3 goals
Reading 3–4 Manchester United (1 December 2012)
Swansea City 3–4 Norwich City (8 December 2012)
Manchester United 4–3 Newcastle United (26 December 2012)
Norwich City 3–4 Manchester City (29 December 2012)
Arsenal 7–3 Newcastle United (29 December 2012)

Top scorers

Hat-tricks

Clean sheets

Player

Club
 Most clean sheets: 18
Manchester City
 Fewest clean sheets: 5
Aston Villa
Reading
Wigan Athletic

Discipline

Player
 Most yellow cards: 10
 Craig Gardner (Sunderland)
 Bradley Johnson (Norwich City)
 Matthew Lowton (Aston Villa)
 Luis Suárez (Liverpool)
 Most red cards: 2
 Steven Pienaar (Everton)
 Steve Sidwell (Fulham)

Club
 Most yellow cards: 78
 Stoke City
 Most red cards: 5
 Arsenal

Awards

Monthly awards

Annual awards

Premier League Manager of the Season
Manchester United manager Sir Alex Ferguson, 71, received the Premier League Manager of the Season. It was his 11th win, awarded in the final season of his managerial career.

Premier League Player of the Season
The Premier League Player of the Season was awarded to Gareth Bale.

PFA Players' Player of the Year
The PFA Players' Player of the Year was awarded to Gareth Bale.

PFA Team of the Year

PFA Young Player of the Year
The PFA Young Player of the Year was also awarded to Gareth Bale.

FWA Footballer of the Year
The FWA Footballer of the Year was also awarded to Gareth Bale.

Premier League Golden Glove
The Premier League Golden Glove award was won by Joe Hart of Manchester City.

Premier League Fair Play Award
Arsenal won the Premier League Fair Play Award after finishing the 2012–13 Premier League top of the Fair Play Table. The award for best behaved fans went to Norwich City for the second year running.

Premier League Merit Award
The Premier League Merit Award was awarded to Sir Alex Ferguson.

References

 
Premier League seasons
Eng
1